Carl Kurlander is an American television writer, producer and screenwriter. He grew up in Pittsburgh and attended Shady Side Academy and Duke University. Kurlander is best known for his extensive work on American teen sitcoms and has served as producer with Peter Engel on a number of programmes including Saved by the Bell: The New Class, Hang Time, USA High and Malibu, CA and as a screenwriter who co-wrote the semi-autobiographical hit St. Elmo's Fire.  He has also produced several documentaries, including My Tale of Two Cities and A Shot Felt 'Round The World.

Kurlander is co-author of The F Word: A Guide to Surviving Your Family with comedian Louie Anderson, and was featured in Po Bronson's bestselling book What Should I Do With My Life?, which landed him on The Oprah Winfrey Show in February 2003, on a program about people who had changed their lives, where Kurlander spoke about leaving Hollywood to move back to his hometown to teach at the University of Pittsburgh for what he thought would be a one-year Hollywood sabbatical.

This journey inspired a movie Kurlander produced and directed, My Tale of Two Cities, about coming home and the city of Pittsburgh reinventing itself for a new age.  The film uses the metaphor of Pittsburgh being the real-life Mister Rogers' Neighborhood and, during the making of the film, Kurlander and his crew got crowds from Times Square to Beverly Hills to sing Fred Rogers' theme song "Won't You Be My Neighbor?"   The film, which was picked up by Panorama Entertainment, has played over 26 cities across North America including special screenings for the International MENSA society, the keynote for the International Downtown Association Annual Conference, and on Capitol Hill at the U.S. Capitol Visitor's Center where Congressman Mike Doyle called the film "a comeback story which can inspire cities around this country."   Howard Fineman of Newsweek and The Huffington Post wrote: '"Carl Kurlander's movie is the wry, funny tale of the fulfillment he found moving back home to the city of his youth. A cross between Woody Allen and Fred Rogers, he reminds us that our cities are the real "Real America" because they are the creative, connected places in which we can best renew ourselves, our country, and our hope for all humanity."

Kurlander is also the producer of the award-winning documentary The Shot Felt 'Round The World, also known as A Shot That Saved The World, which won Best Documentary at the San Luis Obisbo Film Festival and has been picked up for broadcast by the Smithsonian Channel.   The film is about Jonas Salk and his team at the University of Pittsburgh who pulled together with a nation to conquer one of the most feared diseases of the twentieth century, polio, and current efforts to finish the job and make the world polio free.  Shot began as a class project at the University of Pittsburgh based on footage culled from the 50th Anniversary Celebration of the Salk vaccine.  The updated version of the film features a rare film interview with Bill Gates speaking about the current polio eradication effort.
  
In addition to continuing to teach as a senior lecturer at the University of Pittsburgh, Kurlander is also the President and CEO of the Steeltown Entertainment Project, a non-profit whose mission is to build a vibrant and sustainable entertainment industry in Southwestern Pennsylvania.  In June 2013, Kurlander moderated a panel at the Producers Guild of America's "Produced By" Conference called "Beyond Hollywood: The Promise of Regional Production Centers" where he discussed the city of Pittsburgh's efforts to take advantage of the current disruption in Hollywood to develop their own sector of the entertainment industry.

References

External links
Steeltown Entertainment Project
My Tale of Two Cities

Post Gazette

Television producers from Pennsylvania
University of Pittsburgh faculty
Writers from Pittsburgh
Living people
Shady Side Academy alumni
Screenwriters from Pennsylvania
Year of birth missing (living people)